Prudential Financial is based in Newark, New Jersey. It began as The Widows and Orphans Friendly Society in 1875, and for a short time it was called the Prudential Friendly Society. For many years after 1877 it was known as the Prudential Insurance Company of America, a name still widely in use. The has constructed a number of buildings to house its headquarters downtown in the Four Corners district. In addition to its own offices, the corporation has financed large projects in the city, including Gateway Center and Prudential Center. Prudential has over 5,000 employees in the city.

Prudential Home Office

The four original Prudential headquarters buildings were built from 1892 to 1911 as early examples of steel framing in Newark, clad in gray Indiana limestone with Romanesque styling, the work of George B. Post. The four buildings were known as the Main Building, the North Building, the West Building, and the Northwest Building, and were the tallest in the city at the turn of the 20th century. All were demolished in 1956 to make way for the current Prudential Plaza building.

Gibraltar Building

The Gibraltar Building was built by Prudential in 1927 at 153 Halsey Street, across from the old Home Office as additional office space. The name was inspired by the Rock of Gibraltar, which is featured in the Prudential logo. The Gothic Revival structure was designed by the architect Cass Gilbert, renowned for many works including the Woolworth Building and the United States Supreme Court Building.

It was sold by Prudential in 1986 to Hartz Mountain Industries, which renovated the building. It was sold in 2021 to an investment partnership, which planned a major renovation to upgrade and 'reactivate' it. It houses the Superior Court of New Jersey's Essex County Vicinage Family Court, Chancery, and Tax Court, as well as other government agencies and private enterprises.

Prudential Building

The Prudential Building is located at 213 Washington Street, across from the Gibraltar Building. It was completed in 1942. Shortly after it was taken over by the federal government for use by the Office of Dependency Benefits (ODB), which responsible for payments to military dependents and their families and moved to Newark from Washington during World War II. Work went on around the clock at 213 Washington Street until it was returned to Prudential in 1946.

Prudential Plaza

Prudential's current main headquarters, Prudential Plaza, opened in 1960 on the site of the former home office buildings during the New Newark era when modernist buildings were built downtown. The International style building is one of the tallest and most prominent on the Newark skyline. The facade of Vermont marble includes 1,600 windows set in aluminum frames. On August 1, 2004, the U.S. Department of Homeland Security announced the discovery of terrorist threats against the Plaza prompting large-scale security measures such as concrete barriers and internal security changes such as X-ray machines.

The lobby of the building was originally adorned with triptych of mosaics designed by Hildreth Meiere entitled "The Pillars of Hercules". The panels had been removed and put in storage; two were formally installed at the Center for Hellenic Studies in Washington, D.C., and another in Newark Museum.

Prudential Tower

In 2011, Prudential announced plans to construct another office tower near the Plaza headquarters. The company had received a $250 million urban transit tax credit from the state which required that it create new jobs and build within walking distance of a transit hub. The site of the $444 million  tower is on Broad Street just west of Military Park. Construction began in July 2013. The exterior of the tower was completed in January 2015 and the building opened in July 2015.

See also
 List of tallest buildings in Newark
 Prudential Tower, the second tallest building in Boston

References

Insurance company headquarters in the United States
Buildings and structures in Newark, New Jersey
Prudential Financial buildings
1940s architecture in the United States
1960s architecture in the United States
Cass Gilbert buildings
Gothic Revival architecture in New Jersey